Nicholas Bryan Trammell, better known by his stage name Nic Nassuet and also known professionally as Nick Ortiz-Trammell, is an American gothic-folk musician based in Hollywood, California.

Career
After years of work with theater group PHAMALY and as a part of the SAG-AFTRA national communications committee where he was noted for facilitating SAG eligibility, Nassuet's debut album Eleutherios was released in 2015 to critical acclaim. Jetset Magazine described his debut release as "[a] blend of Celtic, blues, rock, folk, grunge and goth" that "explores and transcends his [Nassuet's] musical boundaries with a true sense of freedom." He also saw radio play on a variety of independent stations.

Musical style
The Huffington Post, has referred to his signature style as "Gothic Folk", a moniker echoed in a June 2015 review by Guardian Liberty Voice. The Global Music Awards gave Nassuet a gold medal for "Alternative Rock Gothic Folk". Review Fix said that Nassuet "put a definable face on the gothic rock genre." Blogcritics compared his style to the Celtic music, Operatic Rock, and Grunge genres. and Big Sky State Buzz said that Eleutherios contained "hints of rock and roll." Nassuet's music has been compared to Jim Morrison, Jeff Buckley, Nick Drake, Richie Havens, Lindsay Buckingham, and Danny Elfman, Meanwhile, his singing has garnered comparisons to singers like Lindsey Buckingham, Axl Rose, and Kate Bush.

Discography
Throe (2015, Dolor Records)

Eleutherios (2015, Dolor Records)

Awards

Honors
Proclamation of Heroism, Denver city council.

Nic Nassuet Day, May 22, 2016, Issued by proclamation of the Mayor of Denver

Diploma of Merit, Association of the Knights of St. Sylvester

See also
 List of alternative rock artists
 Neofolk
 List of gothic rock artists

References

External links
 
 
 Nic Nassuet at AllMusic

Year of birth missing (living people)
Living people
21st-century American singers
Alternative rock singers
American alternative rock musicians
American rock singers
People from Hollywood, Los Angeles
Singers from Los Angeles
Songwriters from California